Manuel Aguirre de Tejada (28 December 1827, Ferrol, Galicia – 9 April 1911) was a Spanish politician and lawyer.

He was Foreign Minister during the reign of Alfonso XII, and Minister of Justice during the regency of Maria Christina of Austria.

After receiving a law degree from the University of Madrid, he travelled to Cuba in 1854 where he remained until the elections of 1857, when he was chosen deputy by La Coruña (province)
representing the Unión Liberal. He successively retained this position in the elections of 1858, 1863 and 1865. In 1876 he was chosen as senator in La Coruna, named life senator the following year and later senator by Own Right in 1903.

After the Revolution of 1868 he became involved in the Conservative Party and was one of the commissioned members who wrote up the Constitution of 1876. Aguirre de Tejada was Foreign Minister from 18 January 1884 to 27 November 1885, and Minister of Justice between 14 December 1895 and 4 October 1897.

He was also president of the Tribunal de lo Contencioso Administrativo (Court of the Contentious Office staff) (1890) and Governor of the Bank of Spain (1895). He died on 9 April 1911.

References

1827 births
1911 deaths
People from Ferrol, Spain
Liberal Union (Spain) politicians
Conservative Party (Spain) politicians
Foreign ministers of Spain
Justice ministers of Spain
Members of the Congress of Deputies (Spain)
Members of the Senate of Spain
Politicians from Galicia (Spain)
19th-century Spanish judges
Governors of the Bank of Spain
Presidents of the Senate of Spain